Let-Mont s.r.o. was a Czech aircraft manufacturer based in Vikýřovice. The company specialized in the design and manufacture of kit aircraft.

The company's two designs, the Tulak and the Piper UL, were based upon 1940s and 1950s Piper Aircraft models. The company appears to have gone out of business in the mid-2000s period.

Both aircraft models offered were designed to comply with the European Fédération Aéronautique Internationale microlight category and were sold ready-to-fly. They were also marketed in the United States as kits for the US homebuilt category, although it seems that none were ever constructed or flown in the US.

Aircraft

References

External links

Defunct aircraft manufacturers of the Czech Republic and Czechoslovakia
Ultralight aircraft
Homebuilt aircraft